Salmehi (also Romanized as Salmeh’ī; also known as Mosalmeh’ī and Moslemhī) is a village in Byaban Rural District, Byaban District, Minab County, Hormozgan Province, Iran. At the 2006 census, its population was 221, in 35 families.

References 

Populated places in Minab County